Dinner in Caracas is a 33-RPM LP album by Venezuelan composer/arranger/conductor Aldemaro Romero, released in 1955, under contract with RCA Victor.

This album was to be the first of a very successful series of records, whose names began with  "Dinner in ..." featuring popular Latin American pieces. The Dinner in Caracas album was innovative work, a stylish modernization of Venezuelan folk music, upgrading it from folk instrumentations to full modern orchestral versions, and making it palatable to international audiences. Recording was made by Romero in the Webster Hall Studios in New York City, owned by RCA Victor, in December, 13th and 14th of 1954. This LP was released in 1955.

The album Dinner in Caracas included Venezuelan-only pieces such as: Alma Llanera, Dama Antañona, La Reina, Adiós a Ocumare, Conticinio, Endrina, Fúlgida Luna, Besos en mis sueños, Serenata, Luna de Maracaibo, and Sombra en los Médanos. In 1993, the master tape of this recording was digitized and a CD version was released by BMG US Latin, owner in that time of RCA Victor's latinamerican music archives.

Track listing

References
 Aldemaro Romero - Venezuela en Ritmo

1955 albums
Aldemaro Romero albums
RCA Records albums
Spanish-language albums
Albums produced by Aldemaro Romero